Gelsey Bell is an American singer, songwriter, and actress, best known for her experimental music and her portrayal of Mary in the 2016 Broadway musical Natasha, Pierre, & the Great Comet of 1812.

Early life and education
Bell was raised in northern California. Her father is a philosopher and her mother is a musician. Bell's sister, Biba Bell, is a choreographer and dancer, and the sisters created a collaborative performance for the first time in 2016.

Bell attended Lehigh University and received a BA with a double major in music and theatre and a minor in philosophy in 2004. She went on to New York University, graduating with a PhD in Performance Studies in 2015. Bell has several published performance studies pieces.

Career

Music

Bell creates experimental music, and often breaks the fourth wall during live performances. She has written solo albums as well as operas, song cycles, and improvisational pieces.

In 2007, Bell joined thingNY, a New York collective of experimental composer-performers. The group has created three concert-length operas: This Takes Place Close By, ADDDDDDDDD, and Time: A Complete Explanation in Three Parts. Bell was particularly praised for her performance in This Takes Place Close By; one critic called her "pure, translucent chorister's soprano" the "icing on the sonic cake.". In 2011, Bell co-founded the collective Varispeed, best known for durational performances of works by Robert Ashley and John Cage.

In 2012, Bell wrote and premiered Scaling, a song cycle, as a part of the Vital Vox Festival. The piece involved many forms of unconventional piano-playing, such as Bell lying on top of the piano and singing while playing. Bell wanted to express a connection between physicality, lyrics, and the way the songs were presented. Great Weather for Media called Bell's work "fresh" and "on the edge of what's happening."

Earlier in her career, Bell released a number of albums as a singer-songwriter, including Under a Piano (2005), February (2008), and In Place of Arms (2010). Most recently, she released Ciphony in collaboration with composer John King, which documented their work with Compagnie CNDC-Angers and Robert Swinston in restaging Merce Cunningham's EVENT. On Ciphony, Bell made use of not only her voice but vocoder and metallophone.

Theatre and Opera
Bell was a part of the original cast and co-arranger of Ghost Quartet (performing vocals as well as metallophone, Celtic harp, accordion, and percussion), and stayed with the show while it performed at various venues all over the US. Bell was praised by critics for her "astonishing vocal versatility," and was referred to as the "standout vocal performance." A new run of Ghost Quartet will re-open Next Door at NYTW, a black box theatre component of New York Theatre Workshop, in October 2017.

In 2012, Bell first became involved with Natasha, Pierre, & the Great Comet of 1812, an electro-pop opera based on War and Peace. She never auditioned for her role, and was instead asked by composer Dave Malloy to come in for its initial workshops, as he had written a part with her in mind. Bell's vocal skills inspired the opera-within-an-opera section of the musical. She refers to the project as her first real acting job, since in most of her other theatrical and musical experiences she was free to portray herself. Bell portrayed Mary Bolkonsky in the musical's initial performances at Ars Nova Theater, and continued with Great Comet through its Kazino run and its 2016 opening on Broadway. The performance marked Bell's Broadway debut. Bell was praised for bringing a "compelling light" to Princess Mary, and for her "impressive intense vocal control".

In 2014, Bell was a performer in Crash, which was the last work of composer Robert Ashley. Crash is unique among Ashley's operas as it is performed completely a capella, with four voices audible at any given moment. The composer wrote the parts with Bell and her Varispeed colleagues in mind. Bell compared Ashley's work to "discovering a garden where different plants blossom on each visit.".

In 2015, Bell collaborated with Erik Ruin to create the show Prisoner's Song, an exploration into life in prison. Bell and Ruin utilized music, images, and recorded testimonials from former convicts in the piece. The pair additionally collaborated to create an art installation shown in Eastern State Penitentiary.

Bell was a featured performer and vocalist in the 2014 operatic film River of Fundament by filmmaker Matthew Barney, with composition by Jonathan Bepler. She has also collaborated on operas with composers Kate Soper (composer) and John King, and has worked with choreographers Kimberly Bartosik and Yasako Yokoshi.

Awards
In 2017, Bell was one of the select group of artists recognized by The Foundation for Contemporary Arts and awarded a sound/music grant.  Bell has also received residencies and commissions from the Jerome Foundation. Bell's Bathroom Songs was included in the 2015 iterations of MoMA PS1's Greater New York exhibition.

Performance credits

Discography
as Gelsey Bell
This is Not a Land of Kings (Gold Bolus Recordings, 2018)
SCALING live at roulette (2012)
In Place of Arms (2010)
love is just a crack in the space of you (2009)
February (2008)
Under a Piano (2005)
Live at the Wildflower (2004)
With The Chutneys
HOME (Gold Bolus Recordings, 2019) 
With Joseph White
Toyland (Gold Bolus Recordings, 2017) 
With John King
Ciphony (Gold Bolus Recordings, 2017) 
With thingNY
minis/Trajectories (Gold Bolus Recordings, 2016)
With Varispeed
Empty Words (Gold Bolus Recordings, 2019)

References

External links

thingNY official website

American musical theatre actresses
American stage actresses
21st-century American actresses
Songwriters from California
Living people
Actresses from California
Tisch School of the Arts alumni
American women songwriters
Year of birth missing (living people)